The South Africa Billie Jean King Cup team represents South Africa in Billie Jean King Cup tennis competition and are governed by the South African Tennis Association.  They currently compete in the Europe/Africa Zone of Group II.

History
South Africa competed in its first Fed Cup in 1963.  They won the Cup in 1972 with a team consisting of Patricia Walkden and Brenda Kirk, defeating Great Britain in the final.

Current team (2017)
Chanel Simmonds
Ilze Hattingh
Madrie Le Roux
Makayla Loubser

External links

Billie Jean King Cup teams
Fed Cup
T